Angunnguaq Larsen is a Greenlandic actor, sound technician and musician.

Larsen plays Mikael in Nuummioq, Greenland's first feature film. In 2018, he co-starred in Anori, a film based on Greenlandic myths. It was the first Greenlandic feature film by a female director.

In the 2010 Danish series Borgen, Larsen played the fictitious Prime Minister of Greenland Jens Enok Berthelsen. When a new series was announced in 2021, Larsen was again included in the cast.

Larsen appeared in 2018 Danish documentary Lykkelænder (The Raven and the Seagull).

Larsen plays the role of a local police chief, Enok Lynge, in the Swedish/Icelandic television series, Thin Ice. Vogue highlighted Larsen's role and described the series as maintaining "balance between earnest political messaging and escapist entertainment [that] is carefully maintained, and immensely satisfying". His performance earned him a male leading role nomination in Iceland's 2021 Edda Awards.

In addition to his acting, Larsen works as the sound technician for Katuaq, the cultural and performing arts centre in Greenland's capital, Nuuk.

Larsen is married with three daughters, and lives in Greenland.

Filmography
 2009 – Nuummioq
 2009 – Hinnarik Sinnattunilu
 2010 – Eksperimentet
 2010 – Borgen
 2011 – Qaqqat Alanngui
 2018 – Anori
 2020 – Thin Ice (TV Series) played Enok Lynge

References

External links

Living people
Greenlandic male actors
Year of birth missing (living people)